The 2016 Women's Basketball Invitational (WBI) was a single-elimination tournament of 16 National Collegiate Athletic Association (NCAA) Division I teams that did not participate in the 2016 NCAA Women's Division I Basketball Tournament or 2016 Women's National Invitation Tournament.

The 2016 field was announced Monday, March 14. All games were hosted by the higher seed throughout the tournament, unless the higher seed's arena was unavailable. First round WBI games were held March 16 and 17 while second-round games were held March 19 and March 20. The tournament semifinals were held March 23 with the 2016 WBI Championship game played on March 26. The Louisiana-Lafayette Ragin’ Cajuns defeated the Weber State Wildcats in double-overtime, winning the WBI for the second consecutive season.

Bracket
Lower Seed hosts unless noted.Louisiana Lafayette and Weber State will host Quarterfinals as higher seed.

*All times are listed as Eastern Daylight Time (UTC-4)

WBI Championship Game

* - Denotes overtime

See also
 2016 NCAA Women's Division I Basketball Tournament
 2016 Women's National Invitation Tournament
 Women's Basketball Invitational

References

Women's Basketball Invitational
Women's Basketball Invitational